Vasyl Lantukh (born 1 October 1969) is a Ukrainian bobsledder. He competed in the four man event at the 1994 Winter Olympics.

References

1969 births
Living people
Ukrainian male bobsledders
Olympic bobsledders of Ukraine
Bobsledders at the 1994 Winter Olympics
Sportspeople from Kyiv